Tammy Lau Nga-wun (born 30 July 1992) is a Hong Kong rugby union player. She represented Hong Kong at their first World Cup appearance in 2017 in Dublin. She started in the match against eventual champions, New Zealand.

Biography 
In 2016, Lau was named Women's Premiership Player of the Year by the Hong Kong Rugby Union at their annual end-of-season awards night. She featured for Hong Kong against Japan at the 2016 Asia Women's Championship and in warm-up match against Singapore prior to the final leg of the Championship series. She scored a try in her teams 40–7 routing of Singapore. Later in November, Lau was selected in Hong Kong's training squad as they prepared for the World Cup qualifiers against Fiji and Japan.

Lau was selected for Hong Kong's two-test tour of Spain and Wales at the end of 2018. She was in the Hong Kong squad that won their first test match and test series in Europe against the Netherlands.

References 

1992 births
Living people
Hong Kong people
Hong Kong rugby union players
Hong Kong female rugby union players